

Group A

|}

First leg

Second leg

Galatasaray won 9–1 on aggregate.

IFK Göteborg won 2–1 on aggregate.

Group B

|}

First leg

Second leg

Dynamo Kyiv won 3–1 on aggregate.

Paris Saint-Germain won 5–1 on aggregate.

Group C

|}

First leg

Second leg

Hajduk Split won 5–0 on aggregate.

Steaua București won 5–2 on aggregate.

Group D

|}

First leg

Second leg

AEK Athens won 3–0 on aggregate.

SV Casino Salzburg won 5–2 on aggregate.

References

Qualifying Round
1994-95